Shane Shumate, better known by his stage name Mascara (stylized as M△S▴C△RA), is an American electronic musician from New York City. He released his début EP, Black Mass, on Tundra Dubs in 2010, following it up with a second EP, Silver Knight Gothic, on Black Bus Records in 2011, as well as VHS tape The Five Wounds on Video/Horror/Show. In 2015 Mascara released an album of "unreleased cuts" called Heru-Ra-Ha on London-based cassette label Dagger Forest.

Discography

Albums
 Heru-Ra-Ha (cassette tape, 2015, Dagger Forest)

EPs
 Black Mass (EP, 2010, Tundra Dubs)
 Silver Knight Gothic (CD-R EP, 2011, Black Bus Records)

Other
 Strobe Cramp (digital split with Ʌ, 2010, AMDISCS)
 The Five Wounds (VHS, 2011, Video/Horror/Show)

References

American electronic musicians
Musicians from New York City